Bridges Burned is a lost 1917 silent film drama directed by Perry N. Vekroff and starring Olga Petrova. Popular Plays and Players produced while Metro Pictures distributed.

Cast
Olga Petrova - Mary O'Brien
Mahlon Hamilton - Ernest Randal
Arthur Hoops - O'Farrell
Maury Steuart - Mary's Son
Robert Broderick - Thomas O'Brien
Mathilde Brundage - Norah
Louis Stern - Solicitor
Thomas Cameron -

References

External links

1917 films
American silent feature films
Films directed by Perry N. Vekroff
Lost American films
American black-and-white films
Silent American drama films
1917 drama films
1917 lost films
Lost drama films
1910s American films